The Rowley Hills are a range of hills in the West Midlands county in England. The range comprises Turner's Hill, Bury Hill, Portway Hill and Darby's Hill. The ridge forms part of the east/west watershed between the River Severn and the River Trent, with rainfall on the western side going to the Bristol Channel via the Severn, and rainfall on the eastern side ending up in the North Sea via the Trent. The hills are situated east of the town of Dudley in Rowley Regis, on the border between the metropolitan boroughs of Dudley and Sandwell.

Views from the summit include the Clee Hills, Clent Hills, Cannock Chase, and much of Birmingham and the Black Country. The height has also led to the construction of two radio transmission towers on the summit.

Portway Hill is the site of a nature reserve of the Wildlife Trust for Birmingham and the Black Country.

Rowley Rag, a form of Dolerite notably used to make kerbstones, was formerly quarried from the Rowley Hills.

Over the centuries that the hills have been inhabited there have been four churches located there, all named St. Giles, in the village of Rowley.

See also
 Turners Hill Transmitter

References

External links 

 Friends of Rowley Hills

Hills of the West Midlands (county)
Rowley Regis